Paul Manheim (1906–1999) was an American businessman whose 40-plus year career with the investment banking firm of Lehman Brothers was mostly focused on providing personal investment counsel and asset management to affluent Americans in the decades after World War II. He began his tenure at Lehman Brothers as a technical analyst, then acted as a general partner for 26 years. He was elected to the boards of directors of more than ten corporations, serving on the boards of motion picture studios Metro-Goldwyn-Mayer and Paramount Pictures. He worked on Lehman Brothers’ development of its first open end investment fund – the One William Street Fund. 
He was a patron of the arts, serving the Brooklyn Museum, the Metropolitan Museum of Art and the Boston Museum of Fine Arts. He was recognized for his collection of Asian art and the respect he had for the genre. He donated most of his collection to the Brooklyn Museum.

Early life
Manheim was born in what is now the Slovak Republic in 1906. He and his family moved to New York City when he was an infant. He had three siblings, all now deceased. Frank (b. 1910 New York City) was an American businessman and also a partner at Lehman Brothers. His sister, Alice Manheim Kaplan (b.1903 Budapest), was a New York socialite and patron of the Arts and former president of the American Federation of Arts. Manheim's younger sister, Louise Manheim Espy (b. 1919 New York City) was the wife of renowned writer and wordsmith, Willard Espy, who credited her for his success as the author of 16 books.

In 1925, after graduating from the University of Virginia in Charlottesville Virginia, he moved to the Caribbean where he worked for Dunbar Molasses and served as American counsel in Guyana, then known as British Guyana.

Business career
In 1927, he came back to New York City and worked for a brokerage firm before becoming a statistical analyst for Lehman Brothers in 1928. His 40+ years at Lehman were marked by his work in involving the firm in providing individual investment services to Americans after World War II.

When Postal Cable and Telegraph Corporation emerged from a chapter 11 bankruptcy, Manheim was named to a new executive committee. Manheim was formally added to the Postal board of directors in 1939.

In 1943, still at Lehman Brothers, he became a director of the Air Express International Agency. The company serviced air shipments for these airlines: Pan American Airways, American Export Airlines, British West Indies Airlines, Aero Visa Brazil and KLM Royal Dutch. Lehman had purchased an interest in the company.

In 1944, he was named a general partner at Lehman Brothers. He was then a member of the boards of directors of the All America Corporation and American Cable and Radio. In 1945, Manheim was elected a director of the Vertientes-Camaguay Sugar Company of Cuba replacing Frederick Adams, who resigned. The following year, following the resignation of Col. Edward Deeds, Manheim was elected chairman of the board, replacing Deeds.

In February 1956, he was elected to the board of Loew's Corporation, the holding company for Metro-Goldwyn-Mayer. The shareholder meeting to elect Manheim was highly contentious, as stock owners questioned the involvement of Lehman Brothers and Manheim in Lowe's. Manheim was elected by over 86% of the voting shares.

Western Union Corp. shareholders added him to the corporation's board of directors 1957.

In 1958, Lehman Brothers, then noted for its reluctance to get into investment services for large numbers of ordinary Americans, announced and underwrote a new financial concept – its first open end investment fund, The One William Street Fund.  The fund was one of the largest financial underwritings ever taken by an investment company at $185 million. Commissions for the underwriters were $15 million. Manheim served as a director of the fund.

Shareholders of Ekco Products, a Chicago-based houseware products manufacturer, named Manheim to the corporation's board in 1959. He was also a director of Lehman Corp. and Security Title Insurance Company, among others, at that time. Toronto-headquartered Brazilian Traction, Light and Power, a company that focused on hydro-electric development projects in Brazil, named him a director in 1961.

In 1961, he became a director of Paramount Pictures Corporation. Five years later, dissident shareholders filed suit against Paramount, Lehman Brothers and Manheim, charging the directors of Paramount had violated SEC rules by “making false statements and claims.” The suit became moot when Paramount was purchased by conglomerate Gulf and Western in October 1966.

Manheim made a move to limited partner status or semi-retirement at Lehman Brothers in 1970. After Lehman Brothers went through a series of internal conflicts in the 1980s, Manheim was quoted in an article on the firm's history and demise, “…we were all friends,” he said, calling the sale to Shearson/American Express “a tragedy.”

Collector of Asian art

Manheim began collecting Asian art in the 1960s. According to his sister, Alice Kaplan, former president of the American Federation of Arts, it was a “marvelous collection.” He was described as one of the unique collectors who had developed a love and respect for Asian art. He was also called “…one of America's most astute and discerning connoisseurs of Indian Arts” by a leading Indian financial publication. Pieces from his collection occasionally still appear at auctions. One, a large schist figure of a standing Buddha, was offered by Christie's in 2009 at $4–6 million. Another, a carved granite statue of Nandi, went for $2–3 million.

Works from the Manheim Collection were donated to Cooper Hewett Smithsonian Design Museum in Washington, the National Museum of Asian Art Smithsonian, and to the Metropolitan Museum of Art.

On Labor Day weekend in 1975, Manheim's apartment in Manhattan was broken into and most of his private collection of Asian art was stolen. More than 200 pieces valued at $750,000 were taken. The FBI later recovered most of the stolen objects; rather than return to collecting, Manheim gave most of the artwork to the Brooklyn Museum.

Manheim was a governor of the Brooklyn Museum and a member of the advisory committee of the Metropolitan Museum of Art. He also served on the advisory committee of the Boston Museum of Fine Arts.

Community service

He was on the executive committee of the Henry Street Visiting Nurse Service in 1940. In the early 1960s, Manheim was a member of the Board of Lay Trustees at Fordham University in New York City. He served as a member on the Grace Commission on cutting government costs in 1984. The commission, formally the Private Sector Survey on Cost Control (PSSCC) was led by industrialist J. Peter Grace, and was established by Pres. Ronald Reagan to eliminate waste and inefficiency in the Federal government.

Personal life

His first marriage to Kate Carns was in 1931; his second was to Ruth Gram in 1958. Both ended in divorce. His third wife, Simone Gardner, survived Manheim. He had two daughters – Emily Manheim Goldman and Martha Manheim Green and one son – Anthony Manheim.

Manheim died in 1999 at his home in East Hampton, NY at the age of 93 in the French style oceanfront chateau he had built in 1960 on property he had owned since the early 1950s.

References 

1906 births
1993 deaths
University of Virginia alumni
Investment bankers
Metro-Goldwyn-Mayer executives